Laukaria is a village in West Champaran district in the Indian state of Bihar.

Demographics
As of 2011 India census, Laukaria had a population of 1348 in 245 households. Males constitute 52.4% of the population and females 47.5%. Laukaria has an average literacy rate of 35.68%, lower than the national average of 74%: male literacy is 61.74%, and female literacy is 38.25%. In Laukaria, 23.81% of the population is under 6 years of age.

References

Villages in West Champaran district